August Rossbach (26 August 1823 – 23 July 1898) was a German classical philologist and archaeologist. He is known for his investigations of ancient Greek metrics, defined as a discipline that studies the patterns and arrangements of syllables and words that characterize Greek poetry.

Born in Schmalkalden, he received his education at the Universities of Leipzig and Marburg, receiving his habilitation in 1852. After becoming an associate professor at the University of Tübingen, he relocated to Breslau in 1856, where he was appointed a professor of philology and archaeology.

With Rudolf Westphal (1826–1892), he collaborated on Metrik der griechischen Dramatiker und Lyriker (Metrics of the Greek dramatist and poet, 1854) as well as Theorie der musischen Kunste der Hellene (Theory of Performing Arts of the Hellenes, published in 4 tomes 1885–1889). He was the author of writings on Catullus (1854; second edition 1860) and Tibullus (1854), and published a work on Roman marriage, "Römisches Hochzeits- und Ehedenkmäler (1871).

References

External links 
 WorldCat Identities (publications)
 ADB:Roßbach, August @ Allgemeine Deutsche Biographie

Archaeologists from Thuringia
German classical philologists
Academic staff of the University of Breslau
University of Marburg alumni
Leipzig University alumni
Academic staff of the University of Tübingen
People from Schmalkalden
1823 births
1898 deaths